Thomas Harris (1829/30–1900) was a British architect.

Work
Though his parentage and early career are unknown, he was established in independent practice in London by 1851.  His works include Milner Field in Bingley (demolished), Bedstone Court and Stokesay Court in Shropshire and the remodelling of St Marylebone Parish Church in London.

Harris was described by Harry Stuart Goodhart-Rendel as one of a group of "those Gothic-Revival architects, addicted to Go, whose works were not marked by scholarship, serenity, or tact" for whose works he coined the term "Rogue Architecture".

Writings
Harris was also an architectural writer, whose works included:
Victorian Architecture: a few words to show that a national architecture adapted to the wants of the nineteenth century is attainable (1860, London: Bell and Daldy)
Examples of the Architecture of the Victorian Age (edited and largely written by him) (1862)
Three Periods of English Architecture (1894)

References

External links
Thomas Harris in the Oxford Dictionary of National Biography

1829 births
1900 deaths
19th-century English architects